Ana Paula Araújo (born 25 October 1981) is a Brazilian model who appeared in the 2007 Sports Illustrated Swimsuit Issue.  In addition to working with world-class photographers on her SI shoots, she was the object/subject of Joanne Gair body painting works in the 2007 edition.  She has also appeared in advertisements for Liz Claiborne.

References

External links 
 

1981 births
Living people
Brazilian female models
People from Roraima
21st-century Brazilian women